The Bruce–Mahoney Trophy is a trophy awarded annually to the winner of an annual sports competition series between Sacred Heart Cathedral Preparatory and St. Ignatius College Preparatory in San Francisco, California. 
The rivalry began with a Thanksgiving day football game in 1892. The two Catholic high schools are longtime cross-town rivals. The trophy was inaugurated in 1947 and is named in honor of Bill Bruce and Jerry Mahoney, each an alumnus exclusively representing one of the schools, both of whom were killed in World War II. 

The two schools play against each other in football, boys basketball, baseball and added in 2021, girls volleyball and basketball. In basketball and baseball, where the teams play more than one game per season, only the first game counts towards winning the trophy. The trophy goes to the school that wins in three out of the five games.

St. Ignatius has won the trophy a total of 53 times and Sacred Heart Cathedral has won the trophy 20 times through 2021–2022. The longest period of time either school has held the trophy is 12 years, by St. Ignatius (1974–1985).

Since the Bruce–Mahoney Trophy began in 1893, it only consisted of boys' sports until the 2021–2022 athletic season, SI and SH announced that the trophy would now be determined by a best of five with the inclusion of girls' volleyball and girls' basketball.

St. Ignatius College Preparatory is the current holder of the trophy, winning it in the 2021–22 season.

Bill Bruce
Bill Bruce (graduated 1935) was an alumnus of St. Ignatius. He excelled in both academics and athletics, especially in football. He participated in many extracurricular activities, including serving as the president of the student body.

He enlisted in the United States Navy at the outbreak of World War II. After flying more than 50 combat missions in Europe, he was killed on April 14, 1943, in an airplane crash while training new pilots at the Naval Air Station in Pasco, Washington.

Jerry Mahoney
Jerry Mahoney (graduated 1944) was an alumnus of Sacred Heart. He excelled in football and basketball, earning All-City honors in both sports during his senior year.

He enlisted in the United States Navy after graduation. He was killed on February 5, 1945, when the merchant ship on which he was serving, the SS Henry B. Plant, was sunk by a German U-boat off the coast of Ramsgate, Kent.

Football winners
Through 2022–23, St. Ignatius has won a total of 52 games while Sacred Heart has won 17. On eight occasions, the two schools either tied or no football game was played.

Basketball winners
St. Ignatius has won 42 games while Sacred Heart has won 26.

On January 19, 2022, St. Ignatius won the inaugural girls basketball game that counted towards the trophy, 60–47.

Baseball winners
Records are not available for years where the other two games had already been won by the same team that year. In years for which records are available, St. Ignatius has won 17 games while Sacred Heart has won 14.

Volleyball winners
St. Ignatius has won 2 games while Sacred Heart has won 0.

References

External links
 Bruce-Mahoney Trophy at Sacred Heart Cathedral
 The Bruce-Mahoney Trophy at St. Ignatius
 S.I. History

Sports trophies and awards
High school sports in California